Honey, I Shrunk the Kids: Movie Set Adventure was a playground at Disney's Hollywood Studios at Walt Disney World Resort in Florida. It was located in the Streets of America area and was based on Disney's 1989 film, Honey, I Shrunk the Kids. The playground, which opened a year and a half after the film, featured  blades of grass, and was themed as a movie set for the giant backyard scenes from the film. Kids could roam through the playground, exploring giant ants and a huge dog's nose. 

On January 15, 2016, Disney's Hollywood Studios announced that the Streets of America section, Honey, I Shrunk the Kids: Movie Set Adventure and Lights, Motors, Action!: Extreme Stunt Show would be permanently closed. They operated for the final time on April 2, 2016 and were demolished to make room for the construction of Star Wars: Galaxy's Edge on the same site.

Overview
The playground featured large movie props and structures inspired by the Disney film Honey, I Shrunk the Kids. The soft play surface used for dirt and other objects were the same objects that are used in the Boneyard Playground in the DinoLand USA section at Disney's Animal Kingdom. The playground featured scenes from the movie but also included areas that weren't explored in the film. They included:

 Large ants
 Explorable anthills
 A spider web/maze with climbing ropes
 A slide made to look like a canister of Kodak film
 A giant dog nose that sprayed mist
  leaking water hose that sprayed
  bumblebees
 Jumbo plant-root mazes
 Oatmeal Creme Pie

References

Former Walt Disney Parks and Resorts attractions
Disney's Hollywood Studios
Streets of America
Amusement park attractions based on film franchises
Honey, I Shrunk the Kids (franchise)
Buildings and structures demolished in 2016
1990 establishments in Florida
2016 disestablishments in Florida